Creative writing is any writing that goes outside the bounds of normal professional, journalistic, academic, or technical forms of literature, typically identified by an emphasis on narrative craft, character development, and the use of literary tropes or with various traditions of poetry and poetics. Due to the looseness of the definition, it is possible for writing such as feature stories to be considered creative writing, even though they fall under journalism, because the content of features is specifically focused on narrative and character development. Both fictional and non-fictional works fall into this category, including such forms as novels, biographies, short stories, and poems. In the academic setting, creative writing is typically separated into fiction and poetry classes, with a focus on writing in an original style, as opposed to imitating pre-existing genres such as crime or horror. Writing for the screen and stage—screenwriting and playwriting—are often taught separately, but fit under the creative writing category as well.

Creative writing can technically be considered any writing of original composition. In this sense, creative writing is a more contemporary and process-oriented name for what has been traditionally called literature, including the variety of its genres. In her work, Foundations of Creativity, Mary Lee Marksberry references Paul Witty and Lou LaBrant's Teaching the People's Language to define creative writing. Marksberry notes:

In academia

Unlike its academic counterpart of writing classes that teach students to compose work based on the rules of the language, creative writing is believed to focus on students' self-expression. While creative writing as an educational subject is often available at some stages, if not throughout, K–12 education, perhaps the most refined form of creative writing as an educational focus is in universities. Following a reworking of university education in the post-war era, creative writing has progressively gained prominence in the university setting. In the UK, the first formal creative writing program was established as a Master of Arts degree at the University of East Anglia in 1970  by the novelists Malcolm Bradbury and Angus Wilson. With the beginning of formal creative writing programs:

Programs of study
Creative Writing programs are typically available to writers from the high school level all the way through graduate school/university and adult education. Traditionally these programs are associated with the English departments in the respective schools, but this notion has been challenged in recent time as more creative writing programs have spun off into their own department. Most Creative Writing degrees for undergraduates in college are Bachelor of Fine Arts degrees (BFA). Some continue to pursue a Master of Fine Arts in Creative Writing, the terminal degree in the field. Once rare, Ph.D. programs are becoming more prevalent in the field, as more writers attempt to bridge the gap between academic study and artistic pursuit.

Creative writers often decide an emphasis in either fiction or poetry, and it is normal to start with short stories or simple poems. They then make a schedule based on this emphasis including literature classes, education classes and workshop classes to strengthen their skills and techniques. Though they have their own programs of study in the fields of film and theatre, screenwriting and playwriting have become more popular in creative writing programs, since creative writing programs attempt to work more closely with film and theatre programs as well as English programs. Creative writing students are encouraged to get involved in extracurricular writing-based activities, such as publishing clubs, school-based literary magazines or newspapers, writing contests, writing colonies or conventions, and extended education classes.

In the classroom 
Creative writing is usually taught in a workshop format rather than seminar style. In workshops, students usually submit original work for peer critique. Students also format a writing method through the process of writing and re-writing. Some courses teach the means to exploit or access latent creativity or more technical issues such as editing, structural techniques, genres, random idea generating or unblocking writer's block . Some noted authors, such as Michael Chabon, Sir Kazuo Ishiguro, Kevin Brockmeier, Ian McEwan, Karl Kirchwey, Dame Rose Tremain and reputed screenwriters, such as David Benioff, Darren Star and Peter Farrelly, have graduated from university creative writing programs.

Many educators find that using creative writing can increase students' academic performance and resilience. The activity of completing small goals consistently rather than unfinished big goals creates pride in one's brain, which exudes dopamine throughout the brain and increases motivation. It has been shown to build resilience in students by documenting and analyzing their experiences, which gives the students a new perspective on an old situation and allows sorting of emotions. It also has been proven to increase a student's level of compassion and create a sense of community among students in what could otherwise be deemed an isolating classroom.

Controversy in academia
Creative writing is considered by some academics (mostly in the US) to be an extension of the English discipline, even though it is taught around the world in many languages. The English discipline is traditionally seen as the critical study of literary forms, not the creation of literary forms. Some academics see creative writing as a challenge to this tradition. In the UK and Australia, as well as increasingly in the US and the rest of the world, creative writing is considered a discipline in its own right, not an offshoot of any other discipline.

Those who support creative writing programs either as part or separate from the English discipline, argue for the academic worth of the creative writing experience. They argue that creative writing hones the students' abilities to clearly express their thoughts and that creative writing entails an in-depth study of literary terms and mechanisms so they can be applied to the writer's work to foster improvement. These critical analysis skills are further used in other literary studies outside the creative writing sphere. Indeed, the process of creative writing, the crafting of a thought-out and original piece, is considered by some to constitute experience in creative problem-solving.

Despite a large number of academic creative writing programs throughout the world, many people argue that creative writing cannot be taught. Essayist Louis Menand explores the issue in an article for the New Yorker in which he quotes Kay Boyle, the director of the creative writing program at San Francisco State University for sixteen years, who said, "all creative-writing programs ought to be abolished by law." Contemporary discussions of creative writing at the university level vary widely; some people value MFA programs and regard them with great respect, whereas many MFA candidates and hopefuls lament their chosen programs' lack of both diversity and genre awareness.

In prisons 
In the late 1960s, American prisons began implementing creative writing programs due to the prisoner rights movement that stemmed from events such as the Attica Prison riot. The creative writing programs are among many art programs that aim to benefit prisoners during and after their time in prison. Programs such as these provide education, structure, and a creative outlet to encourage rehabilitation. These programs' continuation relies heavily on volunteers and outside financial support from sources such as authors and activist groups.

The Poets Playwrights Essayists Editors and Novelists, known as PEN, were among the most significant contributors to creative writing programs in America. In 1971, PEN established the Prison Writing Committee to implement and advocate for creative writing programs in prisons throughout the U.S. The PEN Writing Committee improved prison libraries, inspired volunteer writers to teach prisoners, persuaded authors to host workshops, and founded an annual literary competition for prisoners. Workshops and classes help prisoners build self-esteem, make healthy social connections, and learn new skills, which can ease prisoner reentry.

Creative writing programs offered in juvenile correction facilities have also proved beneficial. In Alabama, Writing Our Stories began in 1997 as an anti-violence initiative to encourage positive self-expression among incarcerated youths. The program found that the participants gained confidence, the ability to empathize and see their peers in a more positive light, and motivation to want to return to society and live a more productive life.

One California study of prison fine arts programs found art education increased emotional control and decreased disciplinary reports. Participation in creative writing and other art programs result in significant positive outcomes for the inmates' mental health, relationship with their families, and the facility's environment. The study evidenced improved writing skills enhanced one's ability in other academic areas of study, portraying writing as a fundamental tool for building one's intellect. Teaching prisoners creative writing can encourage literacy, teach necessary life skills, and provide prisoners with an outlet to express regret, accountability, responsibility, and a kind of restorative justice.

Elements

Action
Character
Conflict
Dialogue
Genre
Narration
Pace
Plot
Point of view
Scene
Setting
Style
Suspense
Theme and motif
Tone
Voice

Forms and genres of literature

 Autobiography/Memoir
 Creative non-fiction (Personal & Journalistic Essays)
 Children's books
 Drama
 Epic
 Flash fiction
 Graphic novels/Comics
 Novel
 Novella
 Play
 Poetry
 Screenplay 
 Short story
 Dialogues
 Blogs

See also

 Asemic writing
 Author
 Book report
 Clarion Workshop
 Collaborative writing
 Creativity
 Electronic literature
 Expository writing
 Fan fiction
 Fiction writing
 High School for Writing and Communication Arts (in New York City)
 Iowa Writers' Workshop
 Literature
 Show, don't tell
 Songwriting
 Stream of consciousness (narrative mode)
 Writer's block
 Writing
 Writing circle
 Writing process
 Writing style
 Writing Workshop

References

Further reading

 Republished as

External links 

 Creative Writing Guide - The University of Vermont
 Writing in the disciplines: Creative Writing - Kelsey Shields, Writing Center, University of Richmond

Writing
Communication design
Creativity